Yongle was the era name of the Chinese Ming dynasty.

Yongle may also refer to:
 Yongle Emperor, the third emperor of the Chinese Ming dynasty
 Yongle Encyclopedia, a 1403 Chinese leishu
 Yongle railway station (Beijing), a future station on the Beijing–Tianjin intercity railway
 Yongle railway station (Taiwan), a TRA station in Yilan County, Taiwan

Towns in China
Yongle, Chongqing, in Fengjie County, Chongqing
Yongle, Leishan County, in Leishan County, Guizhou
Yongle, Heilongjiang, in Zhaozhou County, Heilongjiang
Yongle, Binzhou, in Binzhou, Shaanxi
Yongle, Jingyang County, in Jingyang County, Shaanxi
Yongle, Zhenba County, in Zhenba County, Shaanxi
Yongle, Ruicheng County, in Ruicheng County, Shanxi
Yongle, Gurin County, in Gulin County, Sichuan
Yongle, Jiuzhaigou County, in Jiuzhaigou County, Sichuan
Yongle, Yilong County, in Yilong County, Sichuan

Townships in China
Yongle Township, Baise, in Baise, Guangxi
Yongle Township, Rongshui County, in Rongshui Miao Autonomous County, Guangxi
Yongle Township, Guiyang, in Guiyang, Guizhou
Yongle Township, Shanxi, in Gu County, Shanxi
Yongle Township, Sichuan, in Zhaojue County, Sichuan

Subdistricts in China
Yongle Subdistrict, Anshan, in Tiexi District, Anshan, Liaoning
Yongle Subdistrict, Shenyang, in Sujiatun District, Shenyang, Liaoning
Yongle Subdistrict, Zhen'an County, in Zhen'an County, Shaanxi

Historical eras
 Yongle (346–353), era name used by Zhang Chonghua during the Sixteen Kingdoms period
 Yongle (942–943), era name used by Zhang Yuxian during the Five Dynasties and Ten Kingdoms period
 Yongle (1120–1121), era name used by Fang La during the Song dynasty
 Yongle (Yeongnak) (391–412), era name used by King Gwanggaeto the Great of Goguryeo